Joseph Dilg (March 3, 1878 – May 12, 1953) was an American wrestler. He competed in the men's freestyle heavyweight at the 1904 Summer Olympics.

References

External links
 

1878 births
1953 deaths
American male sport wrestlers
Olympic wrestlers of the United States
Wrestlers at the 1904 Summer Olympics
Sportspeople from St. Louis